Enemy of the people is a term used as a designation for the political or class opponents of the subgroup in power within a larger group.

Enemy of the people may also refer to:

 An Enemy of the People, a 1882 play by Henrik Ibsen
 An Enemy of the People (1958 film), an Australian adaptation of the play
 An Enemy of the People, a 1950 play by Arthur Miller, adapted from Ibsen's play
 An Enemy of the People (1978 film), based on the play by Miller
 An Enemy of the People (1990 film), UK release of Ganashatru, an Indian film
 Enemy of the People (book), by Adriaan Basson and Pieter du Toit, 2007
 Enemies of the People (film), a 2009 British/Cambodian documentary film 
 "Enemies of the People" (headline), a controversial 2016 Daily Mail headline

See also

Enemy of the state (disambiguation)